The Spanish Dikes, located northeast of Agana Springs, Hagåtña, Guam, are historic 19th-century water control structures that were listed on the National Register of Historic Places in 1974.

There are two sections of dikes in a swampy region outside Hagåtña. Both sections are constructed of mortared limestone, with buttresses for support, and openings at the top that act as sluiceways where water flow could be controlled. The construction dates of these dikes is unknown, but similar structures were likely to exist in the area in the 1830s, and in the 1870s the area was being used for cultivation of rice by Filipino penal labor in an effort to solve the island's long-standing issues with insufficient food production.

See also
National Register of Historic Places listings in Guam

References 

Buildings and structures on the National Register of Historic Places in Guam
Dikes in the United States
1800s establishments in the Spanish East Indies
1800s establishments in Oceania
19th-century establishments in Guam
Buildings and structures in Hagåtña, Guam